The Democratic Alignment (DISI), also translated as Democratic Coalition, was a political alliance in Greece.

History
The alliance was launched on 30 August 2015 by the Panhellenic Socialist Movement (PASOK) and the Democratic Left (DIMAR).

In the September 2015 legislative election, the alliance received 6.3% of the vote, providing the mandate for 17 seats in the Hellenic Parliament.

In January 2017, the Movement of Democratic Socialists joined Democratic Alignment.

Οn 13 January 2017, MPs Leonidas Grigorakos and Ilchan Achmet joined the Democratic Alignment.

On 16–18 March 2018, DISI and other Greek centre-left parties merged into Movement for Change.

Election results

Hellenic Parliament

A 09/2015 results compared to the combined totals for PASOK and DIMAR in the January 2015 election.

Name
The name Democratic Alignment has been previously used by a 1950/51 centre-left coalition. It had previously been proposed in 2014 by Evangelos Venizelos as a new name for PASOK, but was rejected by former prime minister George Papandreou.

See also
 Olive Tree (Greece)

References

External links 
 Candidates

2015 establishments in Greece
Defunct political party alliances in Greece
Political parties established in 2015
Social democratic parties in Greece
PASOK
Pro-European political parties in Greece